Sarifuddin bin Hata is a Malaysian politician who has served as Member of the Sabah State Legislative Assembly (MLA) for Merotai since May 2018. He served as the State Assistant Minister of Finance of Sabah in the Heritage Party (WARISAN) state administration under former Chief Minister and former Minister Shafie Apdal from May 2018 to the collapse of the WARSIAN state administration in September 2020. He is a member of WARISAN.

Election results

References

Malaysian politicians
Living people
Year of birth missing (living people)